Television Kiribati Ltd, or TV Kiribati, was the sole, state-owned television service in Kiribati.

Programming
Established in 2002, it broadcast "local and foreign programmes", and was accessible only in South Tarawa (the country's capital) and in the neighbouring island-town of Betio. It provided "about one hour of local programming" on weekdays, and did not broadcast over week-ends.

Undetermined Suspension
Television Kiribati was suspended by the government in March 2013, due to "serious financial problems", and its personnel's "lack [of] expertise and knowledge in programming and production". The government announced a review to determine whether the closure should be permanent. As it was the only television service, viewers in Tarawa South were left with access to radio and newspapers as their media for information.

See also
 Media in Kiribati

References

Television stations in Kiribati
Television channels and stations established in 2004